Thoeny is a ghost town in the northern part of Valley County, Montana, United States, near the Canadian province of Saskatchewan. Thoeny is located north of Hinsdale and west of Opheim. The school house still stands. There is also a cemetery located on the hill.

History
Thoeny was named for its first postmaster, Jacob Thoeny, in 1915. By 1918, the community had two general stores, a newspaper, a blacksmith shop, and several other businesses, all without the benefit of being located near a railroad. A schoolhouse, a cemetery and a few foundations are reminders of the community. Thoeny is located near the Canadian province of Saskatchewan, north of Hinsdale and west of Opheim.

Population

The census district named Barnard was seceded from Thoeny and had a population of 76 in 1930. Thoeny became part of the Hinsdale Rural CCD in the 1940 Census, along with Barnard and Nott.

References

Ghost towns in Montana
Geography of Valley County, Montana